Luis Pasamontes Rodriguez (born 2 October 1979 in Cangas del Narcea) is a Spanish former professional racing cyclist, who last rode for the .

Major results

2003
 8th Trofeo Calvià
2004
 1st Memorial Manuel Galera
 5th Trofeo Luis Puig
 9th Trofeo Manacor
2005
 6th Subida a Urkiola
 7th Overall Vuelta a Asturias
2006
 2nd Overall Tour of Britain
 5th Overall Vuelta a Andalucía
2007
 Tour de Wallonie
1st  Mountains classification
1st  Sprints classification
1st Stage 1
 1st  Mountains classification, Volta a Catalunya
 8th Overall Vuelta a Andalucía
 9th Overall Tour de Langkawi
2008
 5th Overall Tour de l'Ain
 7th Overall Vuelta a La Rioja
2009
 7th Overall Four Days of Dunkirk
2010
 10th Overall Vuelta a la Comunidad de Madrid
2011
 5th Overall Vuelta a Andalucía
 5th Overall Vuelta a Asturias
2012
 8th Overall Vuelta del Uruguay

Grand Tour general classification results timeline

References

External links

Cyclists from Asturias
Spanish male cyclists
1979 births
Living people
People from Narcea